Race City Motorsport Park, also known as Race City, was a multi-track auto racing facility located in Calgary, Alberta, Canada.  The facility featured a ¼ mile dragstrip, a  11-turn road course, and a ½ mile paved short oval.

The Race City grounds, known as Race City Speedway, was a regular host of Warped Tour.

Race City was due to close around October 9, 2009. However, on September 28, 2009, Calgary city council voted in favour of extending the lease on Race City until 2015. This decision was later overturned, and the track officially closed on October 21, 2011.

See also
 List of auto racing tracks in Canada

References

External links
 Official site
 Map of Race City
 Satellite view of Race City on Google Maps
 Some racing pics from Race City Motorsport Park
 Race city Memories Facebook page 

Sports venues in Calgary
Motorsport venues in Alberta
Drag racing venues in Canada
Paved oval racing venues in Canada
Road racing venues in Canada
Defunct motorsport venues in Canada
Defunct drag racing venues
Sports venues completed in 1985
1985 establishments in Alberta
2011 disestablishments in Alberta